The Sanctions and Anti-Money Laundering Act 2018 (SAMLA 2018) is an Act of Parliament of the United Kingdom applying to the United Kingdom.

The Act has two purposes; a) To enable the UK to create its own sanctions framework, allowing it to issue sanctions rather than adopting EU or UN models, and b) to make provisions of the purposes of the detection, investigation and prevention of money laundering and terrorist financing, and to implement standards published by the Financial Action Task Force (FATF), removing the need to adopt EU directives.

Introduction of the Act 
The Sanctions and Anti-Money Laundering Act 2018 (SAMLA 2018) was introduced to allow the UK to impose economic and other sanctions, and money laundering and terrorist financing regulations. Without introducing the Act, the UK would be at risk of breaching its international obligations as a member of the United Nations following Britain’s exit from the EU (colloquially referred to as ‘Brexit’).

The Act allows the UK to implement sanctions passed by resolutions of the UN Security Council which were previously implemented through EU regulations under the EU’s Common Foreign and Security Policy.

On 1 May 2018, the UK House of Commons, without opposition, added the "Magnitsky amendment" to the Sanctions and Anti-Money Laundering Bill that allowed the British government to impose sanctions on people who commit gross human rights violations.

The act received royal assent on 23 May 2018, and by 12 July 2020 the Act was being used to sanction 49 individuals. Of those sanctioned 25 were Russian, 20 were Saudi Arabian, two were from Myanmar and two organisations were North Korean. Chief Executive of Hong Kong Carrie Lam was mentioned in Parliament by both parties that month in connection with the Act.

From the 31 December 2020, types of sanctions in the UK have changed due to Brexit and it is important that all organisations comply with and understand the new laws.

The Sanctions and Anti-Money Laundering Act 2018

The power to make sanctions regulations 
Much of the act covers the UK’s powers to make and enforce its own sanctions. The Act confers broad powers upon the Secretary of State and the Treasury as the ‘appropriate Minister’ to impose sanctions regulations for compliance with a UN obligation or any other international obligation, or for a purpose that would:

 prevent terrorist acts in the UK or elsewhere
 in the interests of national security
 the interests of global peace and security
 assist a UK government foreign policy goal
 promote the end of a war or protect civilians caught up in a conflict zone
 discourage gross abuses of human rights, promote compliance with international human rights law or international humanitarian law
 contribute to mutual international endeavours to thwart the spread and use of weapons and materials of mass destruction
 foster respect for democracy and the rule of law

For this reason, it is easier for the UK to impose sanctions under SAMLA 2018 if it is deemed appropriate by ministers. Under the UK’s prior adherence to EU regulations sanctions were only to be imposed when strictly necessary. This increase of UK powers to impose sanctions has been criticised by some, with Lord Judge in the House of Lords commenting that it was a “bonanza of regulations”, further stating that the Bill should be rechristened as “the ‘Sanctions and Anti-Money Laundering (Regulation Bulk Buy) Bill".

The types of sanction outlined in the bill are;

 Financial sanctions
 Immigration sanctions
 Trade sanctions
 Aircraft sanctions
 Shipping sanctions
 Other sanctions for the purposes of UN obligations

By way of ‘other sanctions’, the Act allows the ‘appropriate Minister making the regulations’ to impose sanctions they deem appropriate to comply with a UN obligation.

Designation by Description 
Under section 12 of SAMLA 2018, it allows the designation of persons by ‘description’ as well as by name. This is not currently covered by EU regulations to which the UK left through leaving the EU.

For a sanction to apply to persons by description, several conditions must be met:

 Given the specific description, a reasonable person could establish whether the designated person fell within it.
 At the time of designation, it is not practicable for the Minister to name and identify every individual who fell within the description.
 The Minister had reasonable grounds to suspect:
 that where the specified description is members of a particular organisation, that the organisation is an “involved person”; or
 in the case of any other specified description, that any person falling within that description would necessarily be “an involved person”.

Anti-money laundering regulations 
The Act covers anti-money laundering and terrorist funding. Through further regulations, it allows the British government to make provisions for enabling or facilitating the detection or investigation of money laundering and terrorist financing, or the prevention of either. In addition, it allows the Financial Action Task Force (FATF) to combat threats to the integrity of the international financial system via the implementation of Standards.

The Act addresses concerns over the transparency of ownership of foreign companies, requiring the Secretary of State to publish regular reports on the progress made in creating a register of beneficial owners of overseas entities.

References

United Kingdom Acts of Parliament 2018
Tax legislation in the United Kingdom
Tax evasion in the United Kingdom
2018 in economics
Magnitsky Act